The 1953 Men's World Weightlifting Championships were held in Stockholm, Sweden from August 26 to August 28, 1953. There were 70 men in action from 19 nations.

Medal summary

Medal table

References
Results (Sport 123)
Weightlifting World Championships Seniors Statistics

External links
International Weightlifting Federation

World Weightlifting Championships
World Weightlifting Championships
International weightlifting competitions hosted by Sweden
World Weightlifting Championships